Melisa Gil (born 9 August 1984) is an Argentine sports shooter. She competed in the women's skeet event at the 2016 Summer Olympics where she placed eighth. She qualified to represent Argentina again at the 2020 Summer Olympics in the women's skeet event.

She is the sister of Federico Gil.

References

External links
 

1984 births
Living people
Argentine female sport shooters
Olympic shooters of Argentina
Shooters at the 2016 Summer Olympics
Pan American Games medalists in shooting
Pan American Games silver medalists for Argentina
Shooters at the 2015 Pan American Games
South American Games silver medalists for Argentina
South American Games bronze medalists for Argentina
South American Games medalists in shooting
Competitors at the 2010 South American Games
Medalists at the 2015 Pan American Games
Shooters at the 2020 Summer Olympics

Sportspeople from Buenos Aires
21st-century Argentine women